Ernest Whitty (7 July 1907 – 1985) was an English professional footballer who played as a winger.

References

Footballers from Warrington
English footballers
Association football defenders
Burnley F.C. players
Darwen F.C. players
Chorley F.C. players
English Football League players
1907 births
1985 deaths
Association football midfielders